Colegio Los Cipreses is a Chilean high school located in Doñihue, Cachapoal Province, Chile.

References 

Educational institutions established in 2002
Secondary schools in Chile
Schools in Cachapoal Province
2002 establishments in Chile